The Chords were an American doo-wop vocal group formed in 1951 in The Bronx, New York, known for their 1954 hit "Sh-Boom", which they wrote. It is the only song they created that reached mainstream popularity.

Career
The group was formed by friends from a high school based in the Bronx, New York, United States. The initial members were the brothers Carl and Claude Feaster, plus Jimmy Keyes, Floyd McRae, William Edwards, with support from the pianist Rupert Branker.  The Chords were one of the first acts to be signed to the Atlantic Records subsidiary label, Cat Records.

Their debut single was a doo-wop version of a Patti Page song, "Cross Over the Bridge", whilst the record label reluctantly allowed a number penned by the Chords on the B-side.  That track was "Sh-Boom", which quickly turned out to be the more popular side.  The record reached the top 10 of the US pop chart, which was then a unique occurrence for a R&B number.  The track was covered by The Crew-Cuts who took the song to the top of the charts, to arguably register the first US rock and roll number one hit record.

The enthusiasm doo-wop fans had for the Chords' music was dampened when Gem Records claimed that one of the groups on its roster was called the Chords; consequently the group changed their name to the Chordcats.  Their success was a one-off, as subsequent releases, including "Zippity-Zum", all failed to chart. A round of personnel changes and recordings on a variety of labels all failed to reignite the public's interest.

Original members
Carl Feaster (lead, September 14th, 1930–January 10th, 1981)
Claude Feaster (baritone, September 23rd, 1933–November, 1975)
Jimmy Keyes (first tenor; May 22nd, 1930– July 22nd, 1995)
Floyd "Buddy" McRae (second tenor; October 1st, 1927–March 19, 2013)
William "Ricky" Edwards (bass, died 1964)  
Rupert Branker was murdered In a mugging In the summer of 1961.(In Los Angeles)

Floyd McRae, the last surviving original member, died on March 19, 2013, at a nursing home in the Bronx, at the age of 85.

See also
List of doo-wop musicians
First rock and roll record
List of one-hit Wonders in the United States

References

External links
Marv Golberg's Article

Doo-wop groups
African-American musical groups
Musical groups established in 1951
1951 establishments in New York City
Musical groups from the Bronx
Cat Records artists